Charles R. "Tod" Goodwin (December 5, 1911January 7, 1997) was an American athlete who played football collegiately at West Virginia University. Playing the position of end, Goodwin spent the 1935 and 1936 season playing professional football for the New York Football Giants.

Goodwin was the NFL leader in receptions with 26 in 1935, which earned him second-team honors on the 1935 All-Pro Team.

Biography

Early years

Charles R. Goodwin, known to family and friends as "Tod," was born December 5, 1911, in Wheeling, West Virginia. He grew up in Bellaire, Ohio, attending Bellaire High School in that city.

College career

Goodwin played football collegiately at West Virginia University (WVU), where the end gained a reputation both for superlative pass-catching skills and for an exuberant confidence that offended the sensibilities of some traditionalists. As a sophomore at WVU, Goodwin's arrogant patter inspired head coach Earle "Greasy" Neale to force him to wear a sign for a week reading "I Am Cocky," in an attempt to shame Goodwin to humility. At the end of the week of what was intended as a public humiliation, Goodwin showed up before the team with a new sign that he had made himself, reading simply "I Am Still Cocky."

Professional career

Goodwin signed to play with the New York Football Giants of the National Football League in 1935, the last year before institution of the NFL draft. The jocular and gregarious Goodwin was popular among his teammates, earning the nicknames "Dingbat," "Baby Face," and "Mouth" from his Giants comrades.

His brashness aside, Goodwin produced on the field, leading the NFL in receiving in the run-heavy year of 1935 with 26 receptions for 432 yards and 4 touchdowns. Goodwin's reception total was a new league record, albeit short-lived, as in 1936 it was surpassed by future Hall of Famer Don Hutson of the Green Bay Packers. The effort was good enough for Goodwin to be named as a second-team member of the 1935 All-Pro Team.

See also

 1935 New York Giants season
 1936 New York Giants season

Footnotes

External links
 "Tod Goodwin," Pro-Football Archives.com, www.profootballarchives.com/

1911 births
1997 deaths
American football ends
New York Giants players
West Virginia Mountaineers football players
People from Bellaire, Ohio
Sportspeople from Wheeling, West Virginia
Players of American football from Ohio